Scomber indicus or Indian chub mackerel is a species of fish in the family Scombridae found in the coast of Kerala, India.

References

Scomber
Fish of India
Fish described in 2016